John Vickery may refer to: 

John Vickery (actor) (born 1950), American actor
John Vickery (artist) (1906–1983), Australian artist
John Vickery (footballer) (born 1951), Australian rules footballer